Under the Same Sky (transliterated: Pod isto nebo) is a 1964 Macedonian war drama film directed by Ljubisha Georgievski, based on a screenplay by Jovan Boshkovski. The film stars Darko Damevski, Bekim Fehmiu and Dragomir Felba. It was released through the production company Vardar Film. The film is set in 1943 Western North Macedonia following the capitulation of the Italian occupiers of World War II.

Plot
The film is set in Western North Macedonia following the Italian occupation of World War II and its subsequent capitulation in 1943. It involves the pro-Fascist Balists trying to take over the area and impose their rule over the region and the National Liberation Army of Yugoslavia trying to free the occupied towns and villages. Three partisans hide from the invading forces. A confrontation eventually takes place, with one partisan finding shelter in a nearby mosque as the town is attacked.

Recognition
The film was one of the classic feature films screened at the 11th Macedonian Film Festival in October 2016.

Cast
Darko Damevski
Bekim Fehmiu
Dragomir Felba
Nada Geshovska
Vesna Kraina
Jovan Milicevic
Dragan Ocokoljic
Slavko Simic
Viktor Starchic
Marko Todorovic

See also

 Cinema of North Macedonia

References

External links
 

Macedonian drama films
1964 films
1964 war films
World War II films